Sachin Nayak is an Indian actor and model, known primarily for his roles in Bollywood films. He was born in the village of Tada, in the Sagar, Madhya Pradesh district. He studied in Dr. Hari Singh Gour University with a post graduate degree in the Sociology. Nayak began acting at the age of 8. He appeared in Rajat Kapoor's 2009 film Siddharth: The Prisoner. He has appeared in over 150 Hindi films and TV commercials.

Filmography

Films

Television

TV commercials
Sachin has acted in more than 150 ad films. He is famous by the Happydent White advertisement in 2006 which got Cannes award for Best Ad. and Best Music in 2006.
He has featured in advertisement for Master Chef India and for Biggest Loser Jeetega. He acted in advertisement of Orpat fan, Jinjola talcum powder, Tata AIG, 
Pepsi,

Birla White Cement,

Coca-Cola,
Tide,
Intel,
Subhiksha Mobile,
list goes longer...

References

External links

 
 
 
 Sachin Nayak on Filmibeats

Living people
21st-century Indian male actors
 Nayak, Sachin
Indian male television actors
Male actors in Hindi cinema
1977 births
People from Sagar district